The list of University of St. Gallen people includes notable students, graduates, professors, and administrators affiliated with the University of St. Gallen.

Notable alumni

Business

Politics, law and society

Academics

Notable faculty (permanent)

Notable honorary doctorate recipients

References 

people
 
St. Gallen